The Belarus Census of 2009 was the second census in Belarus after it became an independent state after the dissolution of the Soviet Union. The census was carried out during October 14–24, 2009. The initial results are to be announced by February 1, 2010. Full processing of census data is expected to take about two years.

97% of residents of the country took part in the census.

In 2008 it was announced that the UN Population Commission approved a grant of $800 million to Belarus for this purpose.

Maps

See also
Belarus Census (1999)
Soviet Census
Russian Empire Census

References

Demographics of Belarus
Census
2009 censuses
Censuses in Belarus